From Rats to Riches is a studio album by the rock band Good Rats, released in 1978.

Critical reception
AllMusic called the album "strong but overlooked." Chuck Eddy, in Terminated for Reasons of Taste, wrote: "Heavier than I would have guessed, and more lyrically and structurally eccentric ... than I figured from supposed bar-band hacks, with sonic influences running the gamut from doo-wop to prog to maybe even punk." The Encyclopedia of Popular Music deemed the album the Good Rats' best.

Track listing
 "Taking It To Detroit" – 3:36
 "Just Found Me A Lady" – 2:50
 "Mr. Mechanic" – 3:39
 "Dear Sir" – 3:12
 "Let Me" – 4:45
 "Victory In Space" – 3:06
 "Coo Coo Coo Blues" – 4:37
 "Don't Hate The Ones Who Bring You Rock & Roll" – 3:18
 "Could Be Tonight" – 2:54
 "Local Zero" – 5:08

Personnel 
Mickey Marchello - Guitar and Vocals
Joe Franco - Drums
Peppi Marchello - Lead Vocals, Songwriting
John "The Cat" Gatto - Guitar and Keyboards
Lenny Kotke - Bass and Vocals

References

1978 albums
The Good Rats albums
Radar Records albums
Harvest Records albums
Mercury Records albums